Zhiting Wu (Zhuting Wu at some), (born November 18, 1995) also known as Joana Wu, is a Taiwan professional pool player.

Biography

Wu was born in Banqiao District of New Taipei City in 1995.

In an international 9-Ball tournament, Wu consecutively defeated 2 former world champions, Xiaoting Pan from China and Allison Fisher from England. She has been called "無敵妹" (Invincible Gal) in 2013.

In the Taiwan selection to Women’s World 10-Ball Championship 2013, she was selected by defeating Lin Hsiao-Chi (WPA ranking 26th), Lai Hui-Shan (WPA ranking 15th) and 2013 World Games gold medal winner Chou, Chieh-Yu (WPA ranking 11th), all of which rank higher than Wu (WPA ranking 32nd) at that time.

In Hokuriku Open Ladies 2013 held by JPBA, Wu defeated Mayumi Taguchi (Japan) with 7:3, 7:0 over Yukiko Tanaka (Japan) and 7:4 over Reiko Motohiro (Japan) in try out on October 5. On October 6 Wu defeated Emi Aoki (Japan) with 7:4, 7:4 over Junko Mitsuoka (Japan) and 7:2 over Chihiro Kawahara (Japan), who is Japan ranking #1 player and the champion of Japan Open Ladies 2014, to get final. In the final, Wu defeated Kuo Szu-Ting, who also came from Taiwan, with 7:5. This was her first international tournament title.

Dec 11, 2013, Zhiing Wu got the third place in WPA World Junior Champions.

Titles & Achievements
 2014 All Japan Championship 9-Ball
 2014 Japan Open 9-Ball 
 2013 Hokuriku 9-Ball Open

References

1995 births
Living people
Taiwanese pool players
Female pool players
Sportspeople from New Taipei
21st-century Taiwanese women